Châteauguay—Saint-Constant was a federal electoral district in Quebec, Canada, that was represented in the House of Commons of Canada from 2004 to 2015. Its population in 2006 was 107,165.

Châteauguay—Saint-Constant was created in 2003 from Châteauguay riding, with the exception of a portion of Châteauguay that was transferred in Beauharnois—Salaberry and Saint-Jean ridings.

Geography

The district included all of the Regional County Municipality of Roussillon including Kahnawake Indian Reserve No. 14, but excluding the cities of Candiac and La Prairie and the Municipality of Saint-Philippe in the east of the county municipality. The neighbouring ridings were Vaudreuil—Soulanges, Beauharnois—Salaberry, Brossard—La Prairie, LaSalle—Émard, Notre-Dame-de-Grâce—Lachine, and Lac-Saint-Louis.

Members of Parliament

This riding has elected the following Members of Parliament:

Election results

See also
 List of Canadian federal electoral districts
 Past Canadian electoral districts

References

Campaign expense data from Elections Canada

Notes

External links

Châteauguay
Former federal electoral districts of Quebec
Saint-Constant, Quebec